In quantum computing, a qubit is a unit of information analogous to a bit (binary digit) in classical computing, but it is affected by quantum mechanical properties such as superposition and entanglement which allow qubits to be in some ways more powerful than classical bits for some tasks. Qubits are used in quantum circuits and quantum algorithms composed of quantum logic gates to solve computational problems, where they are used for input/output and intermediate computations. 

A physical qubit is a physical device that behaves as a two-state quantum system, used as a component of a computer system. A logical qubit is a physical or abstract qubit that performs as specified in a quantum algorithm or quantum circuit subject to unitary transformations, has a long enough coherence time to be usable by quantum logic gates (c.f. propagation delay for classical logic gates).

, most technologies used to implement qubits face issues of stability, decoherence, fault tolerance and scalability. Because of this, many physical qubits are needed for the purposes of error-correction to produce an entity which behaves logically as a single qubit would in a quantum circuit or algorithm; this is the subject of quantum error correction. Thus, contemporary logical qubits typically consist of many physical qubits to provide stability, error-correction and fault tolerance needed to perform useful computations.

Overview 
1-bit and 2-bit quantum gate operations have been shown to be universal. A quantum algorithm can be instantiated as a quantum circuit.

A logical qubit specifies how a single qubit should behave in a quantum algorithm, subject to quantum logic operations which can be built out of quantum logic gates.  However, issues in current technologies preclude single two-state quantum systems, which can be used as physical qubits, from reliably encoding and retaining this information for long enough to be useful.  Therefore, current attempts to produce scalable quantum computers require quantum error correction, and multiple (currently many) physical qubits must be used to create a single, error-tolerant logical qubit. Depending on the error-correction scheme used, and the error rates of each physical qubit, a single logical qubit could be formed of up to 1,000 physical qubits.

Topological quantum computing 

The approach of topological qubits, which takes advantage of topological effects in quantum mechanics, has been proposed as needing many fewer or even a single physical qubit per logical qubit. Topological qubits rely on a class of particles called anyons which have spin that is neither half-integral (fermions) nor integral (bosons), and therefore obey neither the Fermi–Dirac statistics nor the Bose–Einstein statistics of particle behavior. Anyons exhibit braid symmetry in their world lines, which has desirable properties for the stability of qubits. Notably, anyons must exist in systems constrained to two spatial dimensions or fewer, according to the spin–statistics theorem, which states that in 3 or more spatial dimensions, only fermions and bosons are possible.

See also  
 Quantum error correction and the quantum threshold theorem

Superconductive quantum computing
Josephson junction
Trapped-ion quantum computing
 Semiconductor-based quantum computing
Quantum dot
Topological quantum computing

References 

Quantum computing